He Xiangu, birth name He Qiong, is a Chinese mythological figure and one of the Eight Immortals in the Taoist pantheon. She is often seen as the only female among the Eight Immortals (though the sex of Lan Caihe, another of the Eight Immortals, is somewhat ambiguous). He Xiangu is believed to have lived in the Tang dynasty and was born in either Lingling District, Yongzhou, Hunan or Zengcheng District, Guangzhou, Guangdong.

Legend
According to the Xian Fo Qi Zong, He Xiangu was the daughter of He Tai, a man from Zengcheng, Guangdong. At birth, she had six long hairs on the crown of her head. When she was about 14 or 15, a divine personage appeared to her in a dream and instructed her to eat powdered mica so that her body might become etherealised and immune from death. She did as instructed, vowed to remain a virgin, and gradually decreased her food intake.

Wu Zetian once sent a messenger to summon He Xiangu to the imperial court, but she disappeared on the way there.

One day during the Jinglong era (707–710 CE) in the reign of Emperor Zhongzong of the Tang dynasty, she ascended to Heaven in broad daylight and became an immortal.

Depiction
He Xiangu's lotus flower improves one's health, mental and physical. She is depicted holding a lotus flower, and sometimes with the musical instrument known as sheng, or a fenghuang to accompany her. She may also carry a bamboo ladle or fly-whisk.

Modern depictions
In the television show Jackie Chan Adventures, He Xiangu was shown to be the Immortal who sealed away Tso Lan, The Moon Demon, even though show lore initially indicated that she sealed away Hsi Wu, The Sky Demon.

References 

Chinese goddesses
Health goddesses
Eight Immortals